Ove Jørstad (20 August 1970 – 10 February 2008) was a Norwegian footballer.

From Alta, Jørstad started his senior career in Alta IF. He joined Kongsvinger IL in 1996, playing in 31 matches and scoring 3 goals in the Norwegian Premier League. In 1998, he joined Lyn. He later played in lower leagues with Ituano FC, Asker and Fossum IF. In 2005 and 2006, he was the playing coach of Fossum.

In February 2008, Jørstad collapsed and died during a training session with the Fossum veterans' team.

References

1970 births
2008 deaths
People from Alta, Norway
Norwegian footballers
Alta IF players
Kongsvinger IL Toppfotball players
Lyn Fotball players
Asker Fotball players
Ituano FC players
Fossum IF players
Eliteserien players
Norwegian football managers
Association football players who died while playing
Sport deaths in Norway
Norwegian expatriate footballers
Expatriate footballers in Brazil
Norwegian expatriate sportspeople in Brazil
Association football midfielders
Sportspeople from Troms og Finnmark